Don Papa Rum is an aged rum owned by Bleeding Heart Rum Company of the Philippines.

History
Don Papa was founded by then Rémy Cointreau executive Stephen Carroll. During a trip to Bacolod, Carroll heard stories of the area having the finest sugar cane in the world. Until that time, rum from the country had been distilled in other areas of the Philippines. He founded the Bleeding Heart Rum Company to manufacture the rum in Negros which is considered the sugarcane capital of the country. Don Papa is named after Papa Isio, a leader of the Philippine Revolution during the 1890s.

Don Papa was first introduced in Bacolod in 2012, then Manila later that same year. The brand has since become available in international markets such as the United Kingdom and Spain. Don Papa became available in the United States in 2017.

In January 2023, Diageo agreed to acquire Don Papa for an initial €260 million (US$281.5m).

Production

Don Papa Rum is produced with a molasses base from an old strain of sugar cane. The molasses is milled by existing sugar mills in Negros and is referred to as "black gold." The fermented molasses is then aged a minimum of seven years in casks.

There is controversy among rum enthusiasts regarding the use of additives such as glycerin, vanillin, added sugar, caramel color and other ingredients in the production of Don Papa. Some contend that because of the use of such ingredients and their impact on flavor profile and texture, Don Papa should be labeled "Imitation Rum" instead. A class action suit has been filed in May 2022 in Illinois alleging that Don Papa should not be labeled "Rum", as the undisclosed use of additives could be misleading consumers.

See also

 List of rum producers

References

External links 
 Official website

Philippine brands
Rums
Distilled drinks

 Don Papa Baroko